The American Basketball Association draft was held from 1967 to 1975.

First overall picks

Note: 1974 ABA College Draft, not 1974 ABA Draft of NBA Players

Further  reading

External links
 https://web.archive.org/web/20140630112516/http://databasebasketball.com/draft/draftlist.htm?lg=a